Criminal Justice is a 1990 American drama film written and directed by Andy Wolk. The film stars Forest Whitaker, Anthony LaPaglia, Rosie Perez, Jennifer Grey, Tony Todd and Saundra McClain. The film premiered on HBO on September 8, 1990.

Plot 
A young prostitute is robbed in the vestibule of a building after having bought drugs and in the encounter suffers a deep and disfiguring slash to her face.

The detectives called to the crime scene, take the injured victim to the police station where she is handed photographs of some felons on their records. She identifies the perpetrator of the crime in the photograph.

The police arrest the suspect and after the victim again identifies her assailant in the police line-up, the perpetrator is charged with aggravated robbery.

At the arraignment, his bail is set at an unaffordable amount. Despite having to remain in custody, he denies any wrongdoing to his keen legal-aid lawyer. On account of his repeated claims of innocence, he refuses to accept any plea-bargain deal, no matter how favourable.

On the other hand, the District Attorney, battles to make the best of the victim/complainant’s case which, despite her positive identification of the accused, is based only on her sole evidence. Coupled with this, the District attorney has reason to believe she might not have been truthful about her reason for being in the building where she was assaulted and robbed in the first place. The complainant is apprehensive about the legal system but certain that the accused was her assailant.

Bail is refused for the accused and several court appearances take place while he awaits trial. The complainant, who suffers the effects of a drug lifestyle is outraged at the refusal of the accused to plead guilty, and, becomes increasingly unwilling to testify.

The trial date is set and, to the relief of the District Attorney on the day, the complainant enters the courtroom to commence her testimony. Upon seeing her enter the courtroom, the accused volubly instructs his lawyer to make a plea-bargain deal so that the trial is stopped.

For pleading guilty to both the robbery and slashing of the complainant, he is sentenced to  years in the penitentiary. From their divergent perspectives both the complainant and the mother of the accused feel dissatisfied about the outcome of the case.

Cast 
Forest Whitaker as Jessie Williams
Anthony LaPaglia as David Ringel
Rosie Perez as Denise Moore
Jennifer Grey as Liz Carter
Tony Todd as Detective Riley
Saundra McClain as Loretta Charles
Joe Lisi as Detective Lane
Stephen Pearlman as Judge Ratner
William Cameron as Mitchell
Chuck Cooper as Judge Whitney
Bill Dalzell as Ratner's Clerk 
Charles Sanders as A.D.A. Crosley
Don Brockett as Judge Mulino
Rick Applegate as A.D.A. Matson
Ro'ee Levi as T.N.T. Officer Rivers
Benjamin J. Cain Jr. as P.J
Jacquay L. McCall as Jessie's Son
Yancey Arias as Raymond Alvarez
Marc Field as Ratner's Law Secretary
Patricia Hicok as Juror Carson
Lonzo Green as Juror Evans
Ellsworth Gearinger as Juror Hughs
Etta Cox as Juror Gibson
Peter Wolk as Weiss

References

External links
 

1990 television films
1990 films
1990 drama films
HBO Films films
Films directed by Andy Wolk
Films scored by Elliot Goldenthal
American drama television films
1990s English-language films
1990s American films
English-language drama films